Niagara is an unincorporated community in Marion County, Oregon, United States. It is the site of the historic Niagara County Park, the first park to be created by the  Marion County Park and Recreation Commission.

The park consists of a historic dam, begun in the 1890s. A survey by the University of Oregon's engineering department reported that work on the dam had been abandoned by November 1904.

References

Unincorporated communities in Marion County, Oregon
Unincorporated communities in Oregon